Stephen "Steve" Smith (born 28 April 1946 in Huddersfield) is an English former professional footballer and football manager. He played football as a player for Huddersfield Town and Halifax Town. He also coached Huddersfield Town and Bradford City, the latter as caretaker.

Smith began his career at Leeds Road as an apprentice in 1961 and turned professional in 1963. He spent 16 years as a player at Leeds Road before a two year spell at Halifax Town.

Smith has the unique distinction of being the only person from Huddersfield to manage Huddersfield Town. He was at Huddersfield for over 25 years during two spells as a player from 1964 to 1977 and as chief scout, youth coach, reserve team coach, caretaker manager and manager from 1979 and 1988. On 26 April 2012 it was announced he was returning to the club as Head of Academy Recruitment.

External links

1946 births
Living people
Footballers from Huddersfield
Association football midfielders
English Football League players
English footballers
Huddersfield Town A.F.C. players
Huddersfield Town A.F.C. non-playing staff
Bolton Wanderers F.C. players
Halifax Town A.F.C. players
English football managers
Huddersfield Town A.F.C. managers
Bradford City A.F.C. managers